James Mitchell (21 January 1880 – 1 April 1958) was a Scottish footballer, who played for Kilmarnock and Scotland.

References

Sources

External links

London Hearts profile (Scotland)
London Hearts profile (Scottish League)

1880 births
1958 deaths
Scottish footballers
Footballers from Kilmarnock
Scotland international footballers
Kilmarnock F.C. players
Scottish Football League players
Scottish Football League representative players
Association football defenders